Selangor Football Club U-20 & U-18 (who formerly known as Selangor III & IV) are the youth development squads for Malaysian football club Selangor that represents the club at the 'Under-20' and 'Under-18' levels. It has trained many players who have become regulars in the Malaysia Super League and Malaysian national team. The vision for the team is "to educate young players so that it will be possible for Selangor to keep a good track record and position in the next millennium".

The club has one of the most successful youth developments in Malaysia. The Selangor President U-20 squad plays in the President Cup and Selangor Belia U-18 squad plays in the Youth Cup. Both competitions are the highest tiers in Malaysian youth development football. The home games for both teams are at the Shah Alam Mini Stadium in Shah Alam, Selangor.

The Selangor President U-20 squad were champions of the President Cup five times in 1988, 1994, 1997, 2008 and 2017, while the Selangor Under-19 squad were champions of the Youth Cup three times in 2013, 2015 and 2022.

Under-20s squad

The squad plays in the President Cup, a national football competition for Under-20 players and are currently competing in the 2023 season.

Current squad

Honours
President Cup
Winners (5): 1988, 1994, 1997, 2008, 2017
Runner-up (4): 1987, 1999, 2000, 2001

Management Team

Under-18 squad

The squad plays in the Youth Cup, a national football competition for Under-18 players and are currently competing in the 2023 season.

Current squad

Honours
Youth Cup 
Winners (3): 2013, 2015, 2022
Runner-up (1): 2016

Management Team

References

External links

 Selangor Football Association Official YouTube
 Selangor Football Association Official Website

Malaysia Super League clubs
Football clubs in Malaysia
Malaysian reserve football teams
1936 establishments in British Malaya
Association football clubs established in 1936
Selangor FA
Football academies in Malaysia